Época de Reyes (English: Time of Kings) is the debut studio album by Venezuelan reggaeton duo Chino & Nacho. It was released on July 10, 2008.

Track listing
Disc One
 Dentro de Mí (feat. Don Omar)
 Ese Hombre Soy Yo
 Tu Caballero
 Taqui
 La Esquina (Reloaded)
 Vagabundo de Amor (feat. Divino)
 Voy a Caer En La Tentacion
 Te Estan Buscando
 Vuelve Ya
 Profesora (Reloaded)
 You Make Me Feel (feat. Baroni)

Disc Two
 Me Mata, Me Mata
 Contigo
 Renacer
 Una Oportunidad / Dentro de Mí (Version Bachata)
 La Pastillita (Reloaded)
 Asi Es El Amor
 Triste Corazon (feat. Huascar Barradas)
 Se Apago La Llama
 Tu y Yo (Reloaded)
 Asi Es El Amor (Version Bachata)
 Ese Hombre Soy Yo (Version Salsa)

External links
 Official Chino & Nacho website

2008 debut albums
Machete Music albums
Chino & Nacho albums